James Henry Francis (born August 4, 1968) is a former American football linebacker in the National Football League for the Cincinnati Bengals and Washington Redskins.  He played college football at Baylor University and was drafted in the first round (twelfth overall) of the 1990 NFL Draft.

References

1968 births
Living people
People from La Marque, Texas
American football linebackers
Baylor Bears football players
Cincinnati Bengals players
Washington Redskins players
Players of American football from Houston
Ed Block Courage Award recipients